Thomas Connellan ( – 1698) was an Irish composer.

Connellan was born about 1640/1645 at Cloonamahon, County Sligo. Both he and his brother, William Connellan became harpers. Thomas is famous for the words and music of Molly MacAlpin, which is better known today as "Carolan's Dream". 
Turlough O'Carolan, Ireland's pre-eminent composer of the 17th and 18th centuries, loved the song so much that he is stated as saying that he would have traded all his own tunes in order to be the composer of Molly MacAlpin.
(Note: according to Carolan's biographer Donal O'Sullivan, "Molly McAlpin" was actually composed by Thomas' brother William.)

Another tune by Connellan, Molly St. George, along with Molly MacAlpin and Eileen Aroon (by Cearbhall O'Dalaigh), comprise the three earliest Irish harp tunes with extant lyrics. Yet another of Connellan's tunes was called Fáinne Geal an Lae (The Dawning of the Day), also known as "The Golden Star". This has similarities with (but is not the same as), the melody used by Irish poet Patrick Kavanagh for his poem, On Raglan Road.

According to Arthur O'Neill (1734-1818):

 Thomas Conlan (Connellan) the great harper was born before my time. I heard he played very well. He made himself conspicuous in Scotland by means of the tune Lochaber, which he plastered on the Scots as one of his own compositions whereas it is well known it was composed by Miles O'Reilly of Killinkere, in the county Cavan under the name of 'Limerick's Lamentation.' However Conlan arrived to city honours in Edinburgh, chiefly by means of that tune among others. I heard they made him a bailie or burgomaster in Edinburgh where he died. (p. 13)

Edinburgh Council record of 11 January 1717 states:

 (p. 21) If this is true then it contradicts the date of death.

References

 The Harpers Connellan: Irish Music of the late 17th century - The life and times of the Sligo harpers William and Thomas Connellan, CD by harpist Kathleen Loughnane, 2009, ISMN 979 0 9002013 3 1.

External links

1640s births
1698 deaths
Irish composers
Irish harpists
Musicians from County Sligo
17th-century Irish people
17th-century classical composers